Gulf Province is a province of Papua New Guinea located on the southern coast. The provincial capital is Kerema. The 34,472 km² province is dominated by mountains, lowland river deltas, and grassland flood plains. In Gulf Province, the Kikori, Turama, Purari, and Vailala rivers meet the Papuan Gulf. The province has the second-smallest population of  all the provinces of Papua New Guinea with 106,898 inhabitants (2000 census). The province shares land borders with Western Province to the west, Southern Highlands, Chimbu, and Eastern Highlands to the north, Morobe Province to the east, and Central Province to the southeast.

Districts and LLGs
Each province in Papua New Guinea has one or more districts, and each district has one or more Local Level Government (LLG) areas. For census purposes, the LLG areas are subdivided into wards and those into census units.

Provincial leaders

The province was governed by a decentralised provincial administration, headed by a Premier, from 1978 to 1995. Following reforms taking effect that year, the national government reassumed some powers, and the role of Premier was replaced by a position of Governor, to be held by the winner of the province-wide seat in the National Parliament of Papua New Guinea.

Premiers (1978–1995)

Governors (1995–present)

Members of the National Parliament

The province and each district is represented by a Member of the National Parliament.  There is one provincial electorate and each district is an open electorate.

References

 
Provinces of Papua New Guinea
Southern Region, Papua New Guinea
Gulf of Papua